Rhinella sclerocephala is a species of toad in the family Bufonidae. It is endemic to the Sierra de San Luis in the Falcón state, Venezuela.
Its natural habitats are cloud forests at elevations of  asl. Its habitat is under strong pressure from agriculture and livestock farming, even within the Juan Crisóstomo Falcón National Park.

References

sclerocephala
Endemic fauna of Venezuela
Amphibians of Venezuela
Taxonomy articles created by Polbot
Amphibians described in 2001